The Electric (better known as The Electric Slide) is a four wall line dance set to Marcia Griffiths and Bunny Wailer's song "Electric Boogie".

Choreographer, pianist and Broadway performer Richard L. "Ric" Silver created the dance in 1976 from a demo of the Bunny Wailer recording. There are several variations of the dance. The original choreography has 22 steps, but variants include the Freeze (16-step), Cowboy Motion (24-step), Cowboy Boogie (24 step), and the Electric Slide 2 (18-step). The 18-step variation became popular in 1989 and for ten years was listed by Linedancer Magazine as the number-one dance in the world.

Controversy 
In 2007, Silver filed DMCA-based take-down notices to YouTube users who posted videos of people performing the 18-step dance variation.

The Electronic Frontier Foundation (EFF) filed suit on behalf of videographer Kyle Machulis against Silver, asking the court to protect Machulis's free speech rights in recording a few steps of the dance in a documentary video posted to the Internet.

On May 22, 2007, the EFF came to an agreement to settle the lawsuit: the settlement states that Silver will license the Electric Slide under a Creative Commons noncommercial license and to also post the new license on any of his current or future websites that mention the Electric Slide.

References

External sources 
The Electric Slide

Line dances
Novelty and fad dances